Paul Richard Shanley (January 25, 1931  – October 28, 2020) was an American Roman Catholic priest who became the center of a massive sexual abuse scandal in the Archdiocese of Boston in Massachusetts. Beginning in 1967, the archdiocese covered up numerous allegations of child sexual assault against Shanley and facilitated his transfers to other states.

Shanley was convicted of child rape and removed from the priesthood in 2004.  Shanley appealed his conviction in 2007 based on questions about the validity of repressed memories, but his conviction was upheld.  Shanley was incarcerated from 2005 until his release from state prison in 2017.  He died in 2020.

Biography

Early life 
Paul Shanley was born on January 25, 1931, in Boston, Massachusetts.  His father owned a bowling alley and pool room and his mother worked as a legal secretary. Shanley attended Huntington School for Boys, working in the summer as a camp counselor. Shanley would later claim that he was sexually abused by a priest when he was 12 years old.  After graduating from high school in 1950, Shanley entered Boston University.  However, after two years, he entered St. John’s Seminary in Boston to study for the priesthood.

Priesthood

1960's 
Shanley was ordained a priest for the Archdiocese of Boston in 1960. After his ordination, Shanley was assigned as an assistant pastor at St. Patrick's Parish in Stoneham, Massachusetts.  The next year, a parent in Stoneham complained to the police that Shanley had sexually abused his 11 year old son. The police were ready to prosecute Shanley, but the father backed off. The mother wrote a complaint letter to Cardinal Richard Cushing, the archbishop, but heard nothing back.  There were other complaints about Shanley in Stoneham.

In 1967, a priest at the National Shrine of our Lady of La Salette in Attleboro, Massachusetts wrote a complaint letter to the archdiocese about Shanley.  The priest relayed allegations from two boys that Shanley sexually abused them during a weekend visit to a cabin in the Blue Hills.

In 1969, Shanley started his Youth Apostolate in the Roxbury section of Boston, ministering to people suffering from drug addiction  and young runaways struggling with their sexuality. He gained "the nickname the hippie priest for his long hair and outspoken views, including his public rejection of the church's condemnation of homosexuality." Shanley's writings included Changing Norms of Sexuality. His work with youth inspired three nuns to start a similar social agency in Boston.

1970's and 1980's 
At a church meeting in Rochester, New York, in 1977, Shanley said that when an adult and a child have sex, ''the adult is not the seducer—the kid is the seducer.'' In addition, he said that punishing the adult only hurts the child.  An attendee at that meeting noted his remarks and sent them to the Archdiocese of Boston.

In 1979, Shanley attended a conference in Boston on sexuality as a representative of the archdiocese.  The February 12, 1979 issue of Gaysweek contained an article about the conference titled "Men & Boys".  The article stated that Shanley defended the value of relationships between men and boys.  Although he was not part of it, a number of conference attendants decided to form the North American Man-Boy Love Association (NAMBLA) During the 1980s, Shanley served as pastor for several years at St. Jean the Evangelist Parish in Newton, Massachusetts.

1990's 
In 1990, the archdiocese arranged for Shanley to minister temporarily in the Diocese of San Bernardino in Southern California. While working in California, Shanley was to be on paid sick leave from the archdiocese.  Bishop Robert J. Banks wrote a letter in January 1990 to the bishop of San Bernardino stating that Shanley had a clean record.  Shanley also signed an affidavit for the Diocese of San Bernardino saying that he did not have any allegations of wrongdoing in Massachusetts.

Shanley was assigned to assist the pastor at St. Anne's Parish in San Bernardino, California. While posted at St. Anne's, Shanley and Reverend John J. White opened a small bed and breakfast property in Palm Springs, California, that catered to gay men. In October 1993, the Diocese of San Bernardino received a letter from Reverend John B. McCormack, a deputy of Cardinal Law, that said the archdiocese had received records of past child sexual abuse allegations against Shanley.  The Diocese of San Bernardino suspended Shanley immediately.

The archdiocese in late 1993 sent Shanley to the Institute of Living, a psychiatric facility in Hartford, Connecticut, for evaluation.  While at the institute, Shanley admitted to sexually abusing four boys and admitted an attraction to adolescent males.  The Institute diagnosed Shanley as being 'narcissistic' and 'histrionic'.

Shanley moved to New York City in 1995 to serve as assistant director of Leo House, a Catholic residence facility in Manhattan.  In 1997,  Cardinal John O'Connor of the Archdiocese of New York was considering Shanley's promotion to director.  However, Cardinal Law dissuaded him from doing it, citing potential embarrassment to the church from Shanley's past.

Conviction and appeal 
In May 2002, Shanley was arrested in San Diego, California, on three counts of child rape from Massachusetts.  The allegations dated to when he was a pastor at St. Jean's.  The victim had filed charges against Shanley only a few days earlier, saying the attacks occurred for several years between ages six and 15.

In February 2005, Shanley was convicted in Massachusetts of indecent assaults and statutory rape; he received a sentence of 12 to 15 years in state prison.  Shanley was laicized in 2004.

The Shanley case was based on recovered memories of abuse that happened 20 years earlier when the plaintiff was a young child.  The validity of recovered media and the alleged prejudice against Shanley due to heavy media coverage formed the basis for his legal appeal.

In 2007, Shanley's new attorney, Robert F. Shaw, Jr., filed a motion for a new trial, challenging his convictions as unjust. During a May 2008 hearing, Shaw argued that repressed memories of childhood rape and sexual assault by family and clergy were without general acceptance in the scientific community and were so-called "junk science".  Shaw claimed that the court had not received accurate information about the scientific status of repressed memories before Shanley's trial.

On November 26, 2008, Superior Court Judge Stephen Neel denied Shaw's motion for a new trial. Shaw then filed a petition for review in the Supreme Judicial Court of Massachusetts, arguing that Neel had erred, and that "repressed memory" is an unproven, hypothesized phenomenon that has not been accepted in the scientific community and should not be admitted as evidence in Massachusetts courts. In January 2009, the Supreme Judicial Court granted the petition and ordered the case transferred from the intermediate appellate court for review by the state's highest court.

On September 10, 2009, the Supreme Judicial Court heard arguments in the Shanley case. Shaw argued that Shanley was prosecuted, convicted and imprisoned based upon inadmissible evidence. The case was closely watched throughout the United States and abroad. On January 10, 2010, the Supreme Judicial Court unanimously affirmed Shanley's conviction. It concluded: "In sum, the judge's finding that the lack of scientific testing did not make unreliable the theory that an individual may experience dissociative amnesia was supported in the record, not only by expert testimony but by a wide collection of clinical observations and a survey of academic literature. ... There was no abuse of discretion in the admission of expert testimony on the subject of dissociative amnesia."

Prison release and death 
Shanley was released on parole from Old Colony Correctional Center in Bridgewater, Massachusetts on July 28, 2017, after serving 12 years. His sentence required him to be on supervised probation until 2027.

Paul Shanley died of heart failure in Ware, Massachusetts, on October 28, 2020, at age 89.

See also
Roman Catholic sex abuse cases
Roman Catholic priests accused of sex offenses
Crimen sollicitationis

References

External links
https://www.googleadservices.com/pagead/aclk?sa=L&ai=DChcSEwjOwvS9ve77AhXCxoYKHVlOA_wYABAAGgJ2dQ&ohost=www.google.com&cid=CAESbeD2dXPtHjDSa9hyELyAnZr1Sea7PgYu8mYVg5aSIuUDr-QcsXYmaCkRXcWHyqzR4HGIpq42PU7gEdWDibBpeGpEdXzRQ8CeQbJq8lgTb4Km6P8oSkPIcVMxuFTNFSjTg-zqv1N-4aplZUjnuJI&sig=AOD64_29F4dsiQw3OYZUuUru_ygRVsQQEQ&q&adurl&ved=2ahUKEwiC7u29ve77AhWwSzABHeSdCiwQ0Qx6BAgMEAE
CourtTV's Paul Shanley trial coverage
Church documents related to the case
Vanity Fair Feature: Unholy Communion
Sacrilege: Sexual Abuse in the Catholic Church

1931 births
2020 deaths
20th-century American criminals
21st-century American criminals
20th-century American Roman Catholic priests
American people convicted of child sexual abuse
American people convicted of indecent assault
Catholic Church sexual abuse scandals in the United States
Laicized Roman Catholic priests
Members of the clergy convicted of rape
Catholic priests convicted of child sexual abuse
American people convicted of rape
Criminals from Massachusetts
People with histrionic personality disorder
People with narcissistic personality disorder
American members of the clergy convicted of crimes